Malabika Sen (also known as Malobika Sen) (born 27 August 1967) is an Indian classical dancer, singer and actress.

Career
Sen is a trained Bharatnatyam and Kuchipudi dancer. She obtained her formal training in Kuchipudi from Sreemoyee Venkat and in Bharatnatyam from Thankamani Kutty. She is one of the empaneled solo artist of Bharatnatyam and Kuchipudi at ICCR. She has performed live in almost all major platforms in India and abroad with distinction. She is also a senior member of Kalamandalam dance group.

She is also a trained singer in North Indian classical vocal music and Nazrul Geeti under the guidance of Dr. Chameli Sarkar and Smt. Rama Basu. Some of her works includes Lag Ja Gale, Na Jeo Na, Meri Jaan and Eto Boro Akash. She has also rendered her voice in the song Ke Bole in Bhagshesh (2018).

In addition, she has also starred in many Bengali films and TV soap opera.

Filmography
Shada Canvas (2014)
Posto (2017)
Bhagshesh (2018)

Television

References

External links 
 

1965 births
Bengali actresses
Living people
Dancers from West Bengal